The 2020 Buckle Up in Your Truck 225 presented by Click It or Ticket was the 7th stock car race of the 2020 NASCAR Gander RV & Outdoors Truck Series season, and the 10th running of the event. The race was held on Saturday, July 11, 2020 in Sparta, Kentucky at Kentucky Speedway, a  permanent D-shaped oval racetrack. The race was shortened from 150 laps to 71 due to rain during the race. Sheldon Creed of GMS Racing would win the 2nd stage, and rain would stop the race before the green for the final stage, making him the winner, garnering the first ever win of his career. To fill out the podium, Ben Rhodes and Matt Crafton, both from ThorSport Racing, would finish 2nd and 3rd, respectively.

Background 

Kentucky Speedway is a 1.5-mile (2.4 km) tri-oval speedway in Sparta, Kentucky, which has hosted ARCA, NASCAR and Indy Racing League racing annually since it opened in 2000. The track is currently owned and operated by Speedway Motorsports, Inc. and Jerry Carroll, who, along with four other investors, owned Kentucky Speedway until 2008. The speedway has a grandstand capacity of 117,000. Construction of the speedway began in 1998 and was completed in mid-2000. The speedway has hosted the Gander RV & Outdoors Truck Series, Xfinity Series, IndyCar Series, Indy Lights, and most recently, the NASCAR Cup Series beginning in 2011.

The race was held without fans in attendance due to the ongoing COVID-19 pandemic.

Starting lineup 
The starting lineup was based on a random draw. Brett Moffitt of GMS Racing was drawn to start on pole for the event.

Race results 
Stage 1 Laps: 35

Stage 2 Laps: 35

Stage 3 Laps: 1

References 

2020 NASCAR Gander RV & Outdoors Truck Series
NASCAR races at Kentucky Speedway
July 2020 sports events in the United States
2020 in sports in Kentucky